Vissi may refer to:

People
Anna Vissi (born 1957), Cypriot singer and actress
Lia Vissi (born 1955), Cypriot singer, composer and politician

Places
Vissi, Põlva County, village in Valgjärve Parish, Põlva County, Estonia
Vissi, Tartu County, village in Nõo Parish, Tartu County, Estonia
Lake Vissi, lake in Vissi village, Nõo Parish, Tartu County, Estonia